Chodkowo Wielkie  is a village in the administrative district of Gmina Płoniawy-Bramura, within Maków County, Masovian Voivodeship, in east-central Poland.

In the years 1975-1998 the village administratively belonged to the Ostrołęka Voivodeship.

References

Chodkowo Wielkie